Quazarz vs. The Jealous Machines is the fourth studio album by American hip hop duo Shabazz Palaces, released on July 14, 2017. The album was released simultaneously with and as a companion album to Quazarz: Born on a Gangster Star. The album features Fly Guy Dai, Chimurenga Renaissance, The Shogun Shot, Purple Tape Nate, and LAZ.

Track listing

Personnel
Adapted from AllMusic entry.
Shabazz Palaces – performer
Thaddillac – guitar, keyboards
Amir Yaghmai – guitar, vocals
Tendai Maraire – percussion, vocals
John Kirby]] – keyboards
Morgan Henderson – flute
Stewart Levine – bass clarinet
Production
The Palaceer Lazaro – producer
Sunny Levine – mixing, producing, vocals
Kamal Humphre – mixing

References

2017 albums
Sub Pop albums
Shabazz Palaces albums